Vijay Singh Soy is an Indian politician. He was a Member of Parliament, representing Singhbhum, Bihar in the Lok Sabha the lower house of India's Parliament as a member of the Indian National Congress

References

External links
Official biographical sketch in Parliament of India website

Lok Sabha members from Bihar
Indian National Congress politicians
India MPs 1998–1999
1956 births
Living people